Pseudathetis was a genus of moths of the family Noctuidae. It is now considered a synonym of Hecatera. It consisted of the species Pseudophia fixseni, which is now renamed to Hecatera fixseni.

References
Natural History Museum Lepidoptera genus database

Hadeninae